List of school districts in San Diego County, California

Primary and secondary
Alpine Union School District
Bonsall Unified School District
Borrego Springs Unified School District
Cajon Valley Union School District
Cardiff School District
Carlsbad Unified School District
Chula Vista Elementary School District
Coronado Unified School District
Dehesa School District
Del Mar Union School District
Encinitas Union School District
Escondido Union School District
Escondido Union High School District
Fallbrook Union Elementary School District
Fallbrook Union High School District
Grossmont Union High School District
Jamul-Dulzura Union School District
Julian Union School District
Julian Union High School District
La Mesa-Spring Valley School District
Lakeside Union School District
Lemon Grove School District
Mountain Empire Unified School District
National School District
Oceanside Unified School District
Poway Unified School District
Ramona Unified School District
Rancho Santa Fe Elementary School District
San Diego Unified School District
San Dieguito Union High School District
San Marcos Unified School District
San Pasqual Union School District
San Ysidro School District
Santee School District
Solana Beach School District
South Bay Union School District
Spencer Valley School District
Sweetwater Union High School District
Vallecitos School District
Valley Center-Pauma Unified School District
Vista Unified School District
Warner Unified School District

Post-secondary
Grossmont-Cuyamaca Community College District
Miracosta Community College District
Palomar Community College District
San Diego Community College District
Southwestern Community College District

See also
Primary and secondary schools in San Diego, California
List of high schools in San Diego County, California
List of school districts in California by county

External links
San Diego County Office of Education
San Diego County Office of Education - School Districts

San Diego

School districts